Mao Zemin (April 3, 1896 – September 27, 1943), also using Zhou Bin as his alias, was born in Xiangtan, Hunan province. He was the head of the state bank of the Chinese Soviet Republic in Ruijin and also the Minister of National Economic Department. He was a younger brother of Mao Zedong and joined the Chinese Communist Party early on. During World War II, he was sent to Xinjiang by the Party central committee in 1938. He and Chen Tanqiu were arrested by the warlord Sheng Shicai while at Ürümqi, Xinjiang. Zemin was executed on September 27, 1943.

Life
Mao Zemin (who took Runlian 润莲 as his courtesy name) was a brother of communist leaders Mao Zedong and Mao Zetan. He joined in the CCP in 1922. He was appointed the minister of the economic department in the Fujian-Guangdong-Jiangxi (闽粤赣, "Minyuegan") area in 1931 and the manager of national bank later in the year. Mao Zemin studied in school for only 4 years.

In the autumn of 1921, Mao Zemin studied in the Hunan self-study University which was founded by Mao Zedong and raised money for the CCP. At the end of the year he joined the Chinese Communist Party.

In November 1922, he organized the workers’ strike in Changsha. At the end of 1922, Mao Zemin went to promote workers’ movement in Anyuan, served as Chief of the workers economy club. In February 1923, he involved in organizing the establishment of joint-stock economic entities under the leadership from the party - An Yuan Road miners’ consumer cooperatives. In August, he was elected as the general manager, while maintained the interest and expanded the welfare of workers at the same time, he also accumulated and prepared funds for the party's activities.

In February 1925, Mao Zemin went to Xiangtan, Xiangxiang for workers’ movement with his brother, built the first countryside party organization. In September, he went to Guangzhou for workers’ Movement study.

In July 1931, Zemin went into the central revolutionary area, he served as Minister of economic department in Fujian, Guangdong and Jiangxi. In December 1931, he was appointed as the Finance Committee member and the manager of the National Bank by the Central Government. at the meantime, he was a part-time manager of the Chinese company which produced tungsten ore.

In October 1934, Mao Zemin as the president of the National Bank to participate in the Long March with the Central Red Army and served as political commissar of the Central 15th brigade, helped to collect food, funds and the whole supply work for the army during the Long March. In November 1935, the Long March reached the northern of Shaanxi province, he was appointed as the economy minister of the government and led the national economic Ministry to break the military blockade of Yan Xishan in Shanxi, helped to transport the cloth and cotton and organized workers to make cotton cloth for the army. In April 1937, he went to Shanghai to perform specific financial tasks.

On September 17, 1942, Mao Zemin along with fellow communist Chen Tanqiu was arrested by the warlord Sheng Shicai, who had been working closely with the Soviet Union but then turned against them. In prison, Sheng Shicai used torture to force Zemin to confess to a Chinese Communist Party plot against the government and to force him to quit the Communist Party. He refused to yield and was executed.

His son, Mao Yuanxin, was important in Mao's last years.

Notes

References
 "Confession of Mao Tse-min [Mao Zemin]", in Whiting (1958) pp. 287–290.
  Full-view Hathi Trust, "Mao Tse-min" many references.

Further reading
 https://web.archive.org/web/20121108002053/http://news.xinhuanet.com/politics/2009-09/02/content_11982820.htm June 21, 2011(Chinese)
 https://web.archive.org/web/20120313112509/http://shuangbai.people.com.cn/GB/158065/9677905.html June 21, 2011(Chinese)
   June 21, 2011(Chinese)
 http://news.sina.com.cn/o/2011-04-04/062022235144.shtml June 21, 2011(Chinese)

1896 births
1943 deaths
Mao Zedong family
Politicians from Xiangtan
People executed by the Republic of China
Executed Republic of China people
Chinese Communist Party politicians from Hunan
20th-century executions by China
Executed people from Hunan